Hong Kong Institute of Technology (HKIT) is a self-financed, non-profit higher education institution in Hong Kong.

HKIT offers full-time and part-time overseas degrees primarily in the fields of Arts, Business Administration, and Science and Technology. Many of these courses have been developed by overseas universities and are delivered by HKIT and international staff on-campus in Hong Kong. HKIT courses are fully accredited by the Hong Kong Council for Accreditation of Academic and Vocational Qualifications.

References

Educational organisations based in Hong Kong
Educational institutions established in 1997
1997 establishments in Hong Kong